RVS College of Engineering and Technology is an engineering college situated in Dindigul, Tamil Nadu, India.

External links
 

All India Council for Technical Education
Engineering colleges in Jharkhand